Sabine Röther (later Kirschke, born 17 June 1957) is a former East German handball player who competed in the 1980 Summer Olympics.

In 1980 she won the bronze medal with the East German team.  She played all five matches and scored nineteen goals.

References 

1957 births
Living people
Sportspeople from Rostock
People from Bezirk Rostock
German female handball players
Handball players at the 1980 Summer Olympics
Olympic handball players of East Germany
Olympic bronze medalists for East Germany
Olympic medalists in handball
Medalists at the 1980 Summer Olympics
Recipients of the Patriotic Order of Merit in bronze
20th-century German women